Bushmead (postcode: 6055) is a suburb of Perth in the City of Swan located  from Perth's central business district.

History 
Bushmead is situated in Noongar traditional Aboriginal country. The Whadjuk (Wajuk) people are local custodians within Noongar country.

The origin of the suburb name Bushmead is from mapping of the area in 1893, with title deeds showing Bushmead as part of the Woodbridge estate. The land had previously been owned by the Department of Defence after it was acquired in 1915.

It was an important location on the Upper Darling Range Railway being south of the end of the Midland Railway yards complex and associated sidings and infrastructure, and the beginning of the climb on the Kalamunda Zig Zag.

A plaque was unveiled at an opening ceremony for the suburb Bushmead in June 2017, by the Member for Midland Michelle Roberts MLA and Cedar Woods developer Chairman Bill Hames.

Development 
Bushmead has been certified under all six areas of the Urban Development Institute of Australia's (UDIA) EnviroDevelopment program. Parts of Bushmead are preserved as a conservation site, ensuring the natural environment in the area is protected and enhanced.

References 

Suburbs of Perth, Western Australia
Suburbs and localities in the City of Swan